Mankulam may refer to:

Mankulam (Kerala)
Maankulam (Sri Lanka)